Sternocleidomastoid artery can refer to:
 Sternocleidomastoid branches of occipital artery
 Sternocleidomastoid branch of superior thyroid artery